El Corpus is a municipality in the Honduran department of Choluteca.

History 
The Spanish founded El Corpus after a mine called Clavo Rico in 1585. El Corpus became a municipality on July 27, 1827.

Demographics 
According to the 2013 census, 75% of the population works in agriculture. Thirty-four percent uses some type of private water system, and 46% uses oil lamps for light. Ninety-five percent use firewood for cooking. Sixty-two percent has a basic education level and 5% of houses has at least one car.

Location 
The municipality is located east of the department of Choluteca.

Villages 
The following 17 villages belong to the municipality:
 El Corpus (Municipal head)
 Agua Fría
 Calaire
 Cayanini
 El Baldoquín
 El Banquito
 El Despoblado
 El Naranjal
 El Pedregal
 El Zapotal
 La Albarrada
 La Fortuna
 La Galera
 San Isidro
 San Juan Abajo
 San Juan Arriba
 San Judas

References

Municipalities of the Choluteca Department